William Dyce Cay, MICE FRSE (28 March 1838 – 13 December 1925) was a Scottish civil engineer. He was responsible for the majority of late 19th century works to Aberdeen harbour. He was described by his cousin, James Clerk Maxwell, as "my best friend, my most valuable collaborator and the best watery engineer in Scotland."

Life
He was born the son of Robert Dundas Cay, an Edinburgh lawyer, and Isabella Dyce (1811–1852).

In 1844 the family moved to Hong Kong following his father's appointment as Registrar to the Supreme Court of that city. His mother died there as the result of injuries from a carriage accident in 1852 and is buried in the Happy Valley Cemetery in Victoria, Hong Kong.

William returned to Edinburgh soon after this, to study mathematics at Edinburgh University, winning the prestigious Straiton Gold Medal in 1856. He then moved to Belfast to serve as an apprentice engineer under Lord Kelvin's brother, James Thomson. On completion of his training in 1858 he began to specialise in harbour design, and spent the bulk of his working life improving Aberdeen's docks and harbours. From 1873 he was assisted by James Barron who later set up as an independent harbour engineer.

He was elected a Fellow of the Royal Society of Edinburgh in 1882.
In 1890 he obtained a house on Blackford Road in Edinburgh.

He died at Folkestone, Kent on 13 December 1925.

Known works

Castle Douglas to Portpatrick Railway (as assistant to Benjamin Blyth) (1861)
Glenlair Bridge near Corsock, Kirkcudbrightshire, (1861) built for his cousin, James Clerk Maxwell who owned Glenlair House
Cluny Harbour, Buckie (1873)
Southern Breakwater, Aberdeen Harbour (1874)
Lerwick Harbour extensions and improvements (1881)

Family

His uncles (his mother's brothers) were William Dyce the artist and Prof Robert Dyce.

His cousin (through his father's sister) was James Clerk Maxwell. They were close friends and Cay served as Maxwell's best man upon his marriage.

References

1838 births
1925 deaths
People associated with Aberdeen
Fellows of the Royal Society of Edinburgh
British civil engineers